Armenian genocide survivors are Western Armenians who were not killed in the genocide of 1915. Most of the survivors became refugees outside Turkey, the successor state of the Ottoman Empire. Other survivors are the non-Ottoman Armenians who resided or travelled through the Ottoman Empire, were spared on personal orders of Talaat Pasha after an Armenian with US citizenship was murdered in a prison in Diyarbakır.

About 70,000 Armenians remain in Turkey, mostly in Istanbul. This figure does not include an unknown number of assimilated Crypto-Armenians.

Distribution 

According to the US State Department, in 1922 there were 817,873 Armenian refugees who had originated from Turkey. This figure was based upon information provided by the British Embassy in Constantinople and 1921 data from the Near East Relief Society. The total given did not include able-bodied Armenians detained by Kemalist Turkey, nor Armenian women and children - approximately 95,000, according to the League of Nations – who have been forced to convert to Islam.

According to the same source, there were 281,000 Armenians still living in Turkey in 1921: 150,000 in Istanbul and 131,000 in Asia Minor.

Eastern Armenia

There was also an Armenian settlement problem that brought conflict with other ethnic residents. In all, there were over 300,000 embittered and impatient Armenian refugees escaping from the Ottoman Empire which were now the DRA government's responsibility. This proved an insurmountable humanitarian issue. Typhus was a major sickness, because of its effect on children. Conditions in the outlying regions, not necessarily consisting of refugees, weren't any better. The Ottoman governing structure and Russian army had already withdrawn from the region. The Armenian government had neither time nor resources to rebuild the infrastructure. The 393,700 refugees were under their jurisdiction as follows:

The government of Hovhannes Kachaznuni was faced with a most sobering reality in the winter of 1918-19. The newly formed government was responsible for over half a million Armenian refugees in the Caucasus. It was a long and harsh winter. The homeless masses, lacking food, clothing and medicine, had to endure the elements. Many who survived the exposure and famine succumbed to the ravaging diseases. By the spring of 1919, the typhus epidemic had run its course, the weather improved and the first American Committee for Relief in the Near East shipment of wheat reached Batum. The British army transported the aid to Yerevan. Yet by that time some 150,000 of the refugees had perished. Vratsian puts this figure at around 180,000, or nearly 20% of the entire nascent Republic. A report in early 1919 noted that 65% of the population of Sardarabad, 40% of the population of eight villages near Etchmiadzin and 25% of the population of Ashtarak had died.

Survivors 

Hrachia Acharian
Vahram Alazan
Aris Alexanian
Grigoris Balakian
Pailadzo Captanian
Arshile Gorky
Hambarsoom Grigorian
J. Michael Hagopian
Katherine Magarian
Gurgen Mahari
Aurora Mardiganian
John Mirak
Yevnige Salibian
Simon Simonian
Soghomon Tehlirian
Kourken Yanigian
Nairi Zarian
Franzi Avetisyan
Krikor Derderian
Shooshanig Palanjian Derderian
Mugerdich Derderian
Araxie Derderian Derderian

Documentary films 
 2011 –   (dir. )

See also
Armenian diaspora
White Genocide

References

External links
Heghine Abrahamyan , a survivor, tells her story.
Setrak Keshishian, a survivor, tells his story.
Genocide Survivors

 
Armenian diaspora
Lists of survivors